The Gavrilița Cabinet was the Cabinet of Moldova, led by former Finance Minister Natalia Gavrilița from 6 August 2021 until 16 February 2023.

Gavrilița was previously proposed as prime minister by Maia Sandu in February 2021, but was rejected by the PSRM-Șor parliamentary majority. Gavrilița resigned along with the cabinet on 10 February 2023. She cited a lack of support for enacting reforms she had proposed in her resignation news conference.

History 
During the vote, the government received the support of 61 members of Moldovan parliament. The ruling Party of Action and Solidarity won mandates during early parliamentary elections in 2021. Gavrilița's appointment marked the end of the six-month absence of government in the country after the previous government resigned in December 2020.

Natalia Gavrilița became the third woman in the post of Prime Minister of Moldova (after Maia Sandu, Zinaida Greceanîi, excluding acting Natalia Gherman). After her nomination by President Sandu, the entire executive branch in the republic became headed by women. As of 6 August 2021, the similar situation has happened only in Estonia, with the current president Kersti Kaljulaid and prime minister Kaja Kallas.
In total, three women became ministers. The head of Gagauzia, Irina Vlah, who was elected in a separate vote in 2015, also participates in the work of the cabinet.

Composition
The new cabinet has 13 ministries, instead of nine as in recent years. The Ministry of Health, the Ministry of Labor and Social Protection, the Ministry of Education, the Ministry of Culture, the Ministry of Transport and the Ministry of Regional Development and Infrastructure became separate agencies. Furthermore, the Ministry of Environment was recreated.

Nicu Popescu returned to the government as Minister of Foreign Affairs, after working in the Sandu Cabinet. The Minister of Health Ala Nemerenco also returned to the government after working with Maia Sandu.

The Başkan (Governor) of Gagauzia is elected by universal, equal, direct, secret and free suffrage on an alternative basis for a term of 4 years. One and the same person can be a governor for no more than two consecutive terms. The Başkan of Gagauzia is confirmed as a member of the Moldovan government by a decree of the President of Moldova.

References

External links
 Cabinet of Ministers

 

Moldova cabinets
2021 establishments in Moldova
Cabinets established in 2021
2023 disestablishments in Moldova
Cabinets disestablished in 2023